Adını Feriha Koydum is a Turkish television drama series which was first broadcast on Show TV from 14 January 2011 to 29 June 2012. A rebooted version aired from September 7 to December 14, 2012. It follows housekeeper Feriha Yilmaz (Hazal Kaya), a young woman from a poor background and the daughter of Zehra Yılmaz (Vahide Percin); and Rıza Yılmaz (Metin Çekmez), a doorman. Feriha is awarded a scholarship to an elite university, where wealthy playboy Emir Sarrafoğlu (Cagatay Ulusoy) studies as well. Emir eventually falls in love with Feriha, believing she is also wealthy.  The series was written by Melis Civelek and Sırma Yanık and produced by Med Yapım.

The series was very popular among younger viewers. The first two seasons of the show were very successful all over the world. The third and final season, titled Adını Feriha Koydum: Emir'in You, which was broadcast from 7 September to 14 December 2012. was not as successful and ended its run after 12 episodes.  The series has been exported to over 70 countries. It was Ulusoy's first acting role, after playing an extra in the Turkish series Arka Sokaklar and Recep Ivedik 3.

Themes and reception
According to Nilüfer Pembecioğlu, Feriha is a symbol of class anxiety in Turkey; though having a university education, she is forced to lie in order to get ahead. Pembecioğlu includes it among the most successful Turkish television serials being shown around the world; it was especially popular in Bulgaria, and was aired in Russia, Bangladesh, India and Pakistan. In Pakistan, it aired on Urdu 1 dubbed in Urdu, the national language of Pakistan. In India, it was dubbed in Hindi and broadcast on Zindagi which is owned by ZEEL. In Bangladesh,  it was dubbed in Bangla and aired on  Deepto TV from 13 November 2020.

Due to demand, the show has been rerun on the same network since 12 May 2016. The third and final season, Adını Feriha Koydum: Emir'in Yolu, which until then hadn't been shown in India, was broadcast for the first time from 16 November to 15 December 2016 under the title "Feriha-New Season" by Zindagi.

Series overview
The series was revived in the 3rd season under the title of Adını Feriha Koydum: Emir'in Yolu from episode 68 to 72. From the 73rd episode onwards, the show was broadcast only with the name Emir'in Yolu in Turkey.

Plot

Season 1 
Feriha Yılmaz (Hazal Kaya) is an attractive, beautiful, talented, and ambitious girl from a very poor family. Her father, Rıza Yılmaz (Metin Çekmez), is a doorman in Etiler, an upper-class neighborhood of Istanbul. Her mother, Zehra Yılmaz (Vahide Perçin), is a housekeeper. Because of her intelligence, Feriha is awarded a full scholarship to attend a private university. She wears her neighbor's lavish clothes, trying to look wealthy. There, she meets a handsome and wealthy young man, Emir Sarrafoğlu (Çağatay Ulusoy), who is known for being a womanizer. Feriha lies about her life due to the fear of being rejected. She and Emir, with passing time and favorable circumstances, fall in love with each other. However, as that love grows, she becomes trapped in her own lies.

Season 2 
Emir's friend Hande Gezgin (Ceyda Ateş) has a crush on Emir, while Emir's close male friend Koray Onat falls for Hande. Feriha learns that Günce is pregnant by Koray and decides to help them by taking up her abortion. Hande publishes a photo of Koray and Feriha hugging in the magazine. Emir first feels that Feriha was wrong, but later he believes her. Feriha borrows fancy clothes from her neighbor Cansu, who is a longtime fan of Emir. Cansu becomes jealous of Feriha and shows Feriha's parents the magazine photos, provoking them to arrange a marriage between Feriha and Halil. After the problem was solved, they broke up with her. Emir discovers Feriha's falsehoods and she breaks up with him. Later, Feriha is kidnapped by Halil and saved by Emir, who marries her. Both Yilmaz's and Sarrafoğlu's families get furious and break ties with them. Emir wants to protect Ece from Yavuz Sanchakter. Due to the entry of Ruia and Ece in Emir and Feriha's life, it was highly disturbing. On the day of the party, Feriha asks Emir to choose between her and work. Later, Feriha discovers Emir taking his decision. Due to a misunderstanding, Feriha divorces Emir in his absence and moves with Levent to the US for 3 years. Emir was engaged to Ece to protect her from Yavuz Sancaktar, until the problem gets solved and Feriha and Emir remarry. However, Feriha is shot by Ece on the orders of Sanem, and she dies in Emir's arms.

Season 3 
Emir (Cagatay Ulusoy) deals with the grief of Feriha's death. Feriha's beautiful cousin Zulal Yilmaz falls in love with Emir. Later, Yavuz Sanchakter's sister Gunes also falls for Emir. At the end of the season Aysun slapped Sanem and Emir goes to Yavuz Sanchakter to sort out things.

Cast

International broadcasting

References

External links

2011 Turkish television series debuts
2012 Turkish television series endings
Turkish drama television series
Television series by Med Yapım
Show TV original programming
Works about classism
Television shows set in Istanbul
Television series produced in Istanbul
Television series set in the 2010s